Elaine Weddington Steward is an American lawyer working for Major League Baseball.

Early life

As a teen growing up in New York City, Steward was hired by New York Mets outfielder Félix Millán. She won the Jackie Robinson Foundation program scholarship in sports management, and went on to attend St. John's University in Queens, New York. She graduated with honors earning a bachelor's degree in Athletic Administration in 1984. She then went on to St. John's University School of Law and graduated with a J.D. degree in 1987.

Career

While Steward was stil in school, she was an intern in the New York Mets' public relations department under Peter Ueberroth. In 1988 she was hired by the Boston Red Sox working as an associate counsel. In 1990 she was promoted to assistant general manager for the Boston Red Sox. becoming the first African American woman and second female minority to hold an executive position in major league baseball.

Awards
Steward was selected as one of the "Ten Outstanding Young Leaders of Boston" in 1999, by the Greater Boston Chamber of Commerce. She was also elected into the YWCA's Academy of Women Achievers. During her time at St John’s University she received the Outstanding Alumna Award from the Black Alumni Association and the St. John’s University President’s Medal.  Later on, she went on to receive the National Association of Black Journalists Sports Task Force’s Sam Lacy Pioneer Award, and the Jackie Robinson Foundation Sports Management award and scholarship. Steward was featured in the National Baseball Hall of Fame and Museum's "Women in Baseball" exhibit in Cooperstown, New York.

References

Bibliography

Browne, I. (2017, February 23). Red Sox exec Steward paved unique path. Retrieved from https://www.mlb.com 
Front Office Biographies. Elaine Weddington Steward, Vice President/Club Counsel. Boston Red Sox. Retrieved from http://boston.redsox.mlb.com
Heaphy, L. A., & May, M. A. (Eds.) 2016. Encyclopedia of Women and Baseball. Jefferson, NC: McFarland.
Major League Baseball Not for Men Only. (1998). Ebony, (Vol. 53, No. 12), 48.
Muhammad, S. (2013, March 1). Women’s History Moment: Elaine Weddington Steward, The first black woman executive in major league baseball.Retrieved from http://jobs.blacknews.com
O’Connor, I. (1997, April 13). The legacy from Jackie’s way to Fenway. New York Daily News. Retrieved from http://www.nydailynews.com

Living people
Boston Red Sox executives
African-American sports executives and administrators
People from Flushing, Queens
St. John's University (New York City) alumni
St. John's University School of Law alumni
Year of birth missing (living people)
21st-century African-American people